Wojciech Jurkiewicz (born 21 June 1977) is a former Polish volleyball player, a member of Poland men's national volleyball team in 2005-2007.

Personal life
Jurkiewicz was born in Lubin, Poland. He is a graduate of University of Wrocław (Germanic Philology). He has a younger brother Mariusz, who is a handball player - member of Polish national team and bronze medalist of World Championship 2015. He is married to Agnieszka. They have a daughter Aleksandra and a son named Igor.

Career
In 2009 he went to DTransfer Bydgoszcz. In 2014 he extended his contract with the club.

Sporting achievements

CEV Challenge Cup
  2008/2009 - with Jastrzębski Węgiel

National championship
 2003/2004  Polish Championship, with Wkręt-met Domex AZS Częstochowa
 2004/2005  Polish Championship, with Wkręt-met Domex AZS Częstochowa
 2008/2009  Polish Championship, with Jastrzębski Węgiel

References

External links

 PlusLiga player profile

1977 births
Living people
People from Lubin
Sportspeople from Lower Silesian Voivodeship
Polish men's volleyball players
Projekt Warsaw players
Jastrzębski Węgiel players
AZS Częstochowa players
BKS Visła Bydgoszcz players